Salesi Fainga'a (born 19 August 1998) is a Fiji international rugby league footballer who last played as a  forward for the Western Suburbs Magpies in the NSW Cup.

Background
Fainga'a was born in Sydney, New South Wales, Australia.

Playing career
Fainga'a played for the Parramatta Eels in their under 20'team for the 2017 and 2018 season. He appeared in Parramatta's u20's grand final loss to the Manly Sea Eagles. Fainga'a represented Fiji in the 2017 Rugby League World Cup, appearing in one game, later appearing again for Fiji against Papua New Guinea in 2018.

References

External links
Parramatta Eels profile
2017 RLWC profile

1998 births
Living people
Australian rugby league players
Australian people of Fijian descent
Fiji national rugby league team players
Rugby league second-rows